All Star Road Band is a live album by American pianist, composer and bandleader Duke Ellington recorded at Sunset Ballroom in Carrolltown, Pennsylvania for radio broadcast and first released as a double LP on Bob Thiele's Doctor Jazz label in 1983. The album was rereleased on CD under the title All Star Road Band Volume One.

Reception

Commenting on the original release in The New York Times, jazz critic John S. Wilson wrote: "It is a collection that brings Duke Ellington and his orchestra vividly alive for anyone who ever saw them and it may offer an explanation of his personal and musical charisma for those who missed him." The Allmusic review by Heather Phares stated: "Fresh arrangements of 'Take the 'A' Train', 'Mood Indigo', 'I Got It Bad (And That Ain't Good)' and 'Sophisticated Lady' make this set as invigorating now as it was."

Track listing
All compositions by Duke Ellington except where noted

Disc 1
 "Take the "A" Train" (Billy Strayhorn) – 4:57
 "Take the "A" Train" (Strayhorn) – 2:50 Vocal by Ray Nance
 "Such Sweet Thunder" (Elington, Strayhorn) – 2:54
 "Frustration" – 3:39
 "Cop Out" – 3:14
 "Perdido" (Juan Tizol, Ervin Drake, Hans Lengsfelder) – 4:34
 "Mood Indigo" (Ellington, Barney Bigard, Irving Mills) - 8:05
 "Bassment" – 4:30

Disc 2
 "Sophisticated Lady" (Ellington, Mills, Mitchell Parish) – 3:56
 "Stardust" (Hoagy Carmichael, Parish) – 3:54
 "Jeeps Blues" (Ellington, Johnny Hodges) – 5:58
 "All of Me" (Gerald Marks, Seymour Simons) – 2:38
 "Diminuendo and Crescendo in Blue" – 11:60
 "I Got It Bad (and That Ain't Good)" (Ellington, Paul Francis Webster) – 3:26
 "On the Sunny Side of the Street" (Jimmy McHugh, Dorothy Fields) – 4:34

Personnel
Duke Ellington – piano 
Shorty Baker, Willie Cook, Ray Nance, Clark Terry – trumpet
Quentin Jackson, Britt Woodman – trombone 
John Sanders – valve trombone
Jimmy Hamilton – clarinet, tenor saxophone
Johnny Hodges – alto saxophone 
Russell Procope – alto saxophone, clarinet
Paul Gonsalves – tenor saxophone
Harry Carney – baritone saxophone
Joe Benjamin – bass 
Sam Woodyard – drums

References

1983 live albums
Duke Ellington live albums
Albums produced by Bob Thiele
Doctor Jazz Records live albums